The Piandao (片刀)  is a type of Chinese sabre (dao) used during the late Ming Dynasty. A deeply curved dao meant for slashing and draw-cutting, it bore a strong resemblance to the shamshir and scimitar. A fairly uncommon weapon, it was generally used by skirmishers in conjunction with a shield.

Chinese swords
Blade weapons